Who Killed Kennedy is an original novel written by David Bishop and based on the long-running British science fiction television series Doctor Who.

Although published by Virgin Books, it is considered a standalone, and not therefore part of then-ongoing Virgin New Adventures or Virgin Missing Adventures series of original Doctor Who novels. The book's plot heavily features the John F. Kennedy assassination on 22 November 1963. Notably, the series began broadcasting on 23 November 1963, the day after Kennedy's death. Its first episode An Unearthly Child was delayed by eighty seconds due to news coverage of the killing.

Plot
The book's credited co-writer, fictional journalist James Stevens, investigates the events occurring in 1970s Britain and the connection between them, the anarchist terrorist Victor Magister (also known as "the Master"), the organisation known as UNIT, their scientific adviser known as "the Doctor" and the assassination of John F. Kennedy in 1963.

References

External links
The Cloister Library - Who Killed Kennedy 
The Whoniverse - Discontinuity Guide entry for Who Killed Kennedy 
Doctor Who Reference Guide entry for Who Killed Kennedy 
Who Killed Kennedy e-book at the New Zealand Doctor Who Fan Club Webpage

1996 British novels
The Master (Doctor Who) novels
Novels by David Bishop
Virgin Books books
Novels about the assassination of John F. Kennedy
Cultural depictions of John F. Kennedy